Girl on the Third Floor is a 2019 horror film directed by Travis Stevens, written by Stevens, Paul Johnstone and Ben Parker, and starring Phil "CM Punk" Brooks, Trieste Kelly Dunn and Tonya Kay. The film tells the story of a deeply flawed man who renovates an old home for himself and his wife, and the supernatural events that ensue as they prepare to move in.

Girl on the Third Floor was released world-wide on October 25, 2019, after having garnered largely positive reviews at SXSW, BUFF, and the London FrightFest Film Festivals. Reviewers took note of the command of the genre of newcomer director Travis Stevens, as well as the convincing portrayal of the main character by professional wrestler Phil Brooks. The film received praise by critics for its "wonderful and gross" usage of practical special effects from UK designer Daniel Martin.

Plot 
Don Koch, a man from Chicago with a criminal past, purchases an old house in the nearby Ellington, Illinois, hoping for a new start for his pregnant wife, Liz, and their dog, Cooper. Shortly after moving in on his own to start repairs, Don meets Ellie Mueller, the pastor living across the street. Later, Don learns from the local bartender about the house's sordid past, and its effect on straight men. Don witnesses strange events within the home, including sludge-like substance seeping from the walls and fixtures, as well as the appearance of marbles throughout the home. Next, Don meets another assumed neighbor, Sarah Yates, who easily seduces him in the upstairs bedroom. After she leaves, the bedroom ceiling collapses revealing a viewing platform in the attic. The next day Sarah appears again and tries to seduce Don, but he admits his guilt and dismisses her.

Milo Stone, Don's former coworker, arrives at the house to help Don patch the bedroom ceiling. He meets Sarah and discovers Don's affair. The two men have an argument, and Don leaves for more supplies and tells Milo not to return if he cannot keep it a secret. While Don is out, Milo follows a marble into the basement where he is murdered by Sarah. When Don returns and does not see Milo, Don assumes Milo left.

The next day, Liz sees Sarah in the background during a call with Don. Becoming nervous, Don installs new locks and security cameras. That night, Sarah lures Cooper downstairs with a marble. When Don wakes up the next morning, he finds his dog dead in the dryer. The police are no help. Furious, Don waits for Sarah to appear, then kills her and attempts to bury her body within the basement walls. He gets a call from Liz and he leaves the body; when he returns to finish the job, Sarah is missing. Don searches for her and breaks through some walls and finds a secret room in the attic with drawings on the wall of a girl with a bird-man figure. While searching in other walls, Don finds Milo's head. Don sees a deformed woman, who attacks him with a marble that tunnels up into his body under his skin. Don slices his neck with a penknife to try to remove the marble, while the woman releases more marbles towards him.

Liz arrives and finds a 1909 newspaper article about the house's past as a brothel and a missing body. Sarah appears and claims she is helping Don renovate the house. Ellie rings the doorbell and tells Liz that the house is bad for relationships. Liz returns to the house and experiences a vision from the house's past with strange men going upstairs to watch "the show". She goes up into the attic and sees a crowd of men in suits peering down into her bedroom where Sarah performs S&M with a masked birdman. She sees a little girl named Sadie in a dark corner of the room drawing on the wall when the masked man gives Sadie a bag of marbles.

When Liz returns to the bedroom she once again sees Sarah, who confesses that the brothel owner killed her and walled in her corpse. Sarah attacks Liz, but Liz hides in the bedroom where she finds Don's lacerated body. He confesses his affair and begs for Liz's forgiveness, but she refuses. Sarah reveals herself inside Don's skin and explains it was a trick and a test before allowing Liz to leave the house for being strong against the will of men. Liz runs downstairs and sees the deformed woman and kills her. As Liz leaves, she finds Ellie, who explains how each person must choose to enter and face their actions. Liz decides to stay in the house to lift the curse. She finds Sarah's body and gives it a proper burial.

Six months later, Liz is living happily alone in the house with her daughter. When the baby is left alone in the crib, Don appears in a ceiling grate and drops marbles into the crib.

Cast 

In addition, dog performer Ryker appears in the opening credits, for its performance as Cooper.

Production

Writing 
During SXSW 2019, Stevens revealed during the post-screening Q&A that much of the story he wrote was not entirely fictional: the house was real and its backstory was "only slightly embellished for the film."

Filming 
Girl on the Third Floor was filmed entirely in Frankfort, Illinois, at a house newly acquired to accommodate the headquarters of Stevens' production company. The house was actually in the process of being renovated at the time, and Stevens paused the renovations in order to use their incomplete state as part of the movie.

Release  
Girl on the Third Floor was released on Netflix on October 25, 2019, though it did raise box office of $145,856 from brief theatrical runs in Mexico and Russia. The film was previously shown at several film festivals, including its world premiere at SXSW and showings at  BUFF and the London FrightFest Film Festival.

World Premiere – SXSW 2019 – Midnighters
Official Selection – Boston Underground Film Festival 2019
Official Selection – Chattanooga Film Festival 2019
Official Selection – Overlook Film Festival 2019
Official Selection – Popcorn Frights Film Festival 2019
Official Selection – FrightFest London 2019
Official Selection – Knoxville Horror Film Festival 2019
Official Selection – Fantasy Film Fest 2019
Official Selection – WYO Film Festival 2019
Official Selection – Cinema/Chicago Film Festival, 18 October 2019

Reception

Critical reception 
 

Oscar Goff of Boston Hassle notes that director Travis Stevens "throws a lot of ideas at the wall, and while not all of them stick, the cumulative effect is dizzying and effective."

In his review of Girl on the Third Floor, Anton Bitel of SciFiNow designates the film a "highly accomplished" haunted house story for the #MeToo generation, "the undoing of 'King Don' is a belated revenge of the female repressed, as well as a long history of perverted patriarchy replaying itself ad nauseam and deconstructing... the uneasy, even exploitative and violent relations between men and women."

Deidre Crimmins, from RueMorgue also notes that while "nearly equal screen time is given to lingering on both male and female bodies... the film itself never quite gets away from feeling a little unkind to women." She points out that the female characters are presented as "not much more than archetypes... the men don't get portrayed very well either, but at least they are given a little more to do." Crimmins does extol the practical effects, calling them equally "amazing" and "gross".

Dennis Harvey of Variety considers Stevens' directorial skills to be well above average for the genre, but offers a mixed review of the film, noting how it draws from films like The Amityville Horror, The Shining and Eyes Wide Shut, and considers Sarah Brooks' lack of convincing "inner malevolence" to be terrifying.

In trying to define the film for her readers, Daily Dead's Heather Wixson notes that Stevens' memorable directorial debut feels like what one would get "if Clive Barker and H.P. Lovecraft had teamed up to make The Money Pit, and singles out Phil Brooks' acting as "compelling". Bobby Lepire, reviewer for FilmThreat, also compliments Brooks' portrayal of Don Koch, further noting that writer/director Travis Stevens has an "innate understanding" of the lessons that horror films teach, in this case a horror story as morality play. As well, Lepire feels that the director effectively sustained the atmosphere of dread throughout the film, but "runs out of steam before the conclusion, making for a not quite, but almost, great film."

Film School Rejects writer Rob Hunter points out that while haunted house movies usually involve misdeeds of the past affecting the present, Girl on the Third Floor instead has present-day bad behaviors "unintentionally reaching out to past transgressions," while opining that Punk resembles "nothing less than the angry love child of Jon Hamm and Ted Raimi with his expressive antics here—walking a fine line with a character who earns our sympathy before threatening to lose it." Hunter sees the main character as needing to find redemption for his past misdeeds  and expresses his hope that "this guy, finally, will understand and acknowledge his actions before it's too late."

Vanyaland's Nick Johnston also described the connection between the main character's behavior and the house's reaction, "Stevens' thematic goals here are interesting and compelling. It's all about a bad man paying for his behavior and, thusly, the actions that his misogynistic forbearers [sic] committed decades ago, and when that bad man is played by Phil Brooks, it becomes infinitely more interesting."

Adi Robertson, reviewer for The Verge.com, notes that, instead of trying to push the narrative limits of the haunted house trope, Girl on the Third Floor generates suspense through the predictable and inevitable fall of Brooks' main character, using foreshadowing and jump scares. Robertson, commenting on the effectiveness of the practical effects, opines, "marbles, mucus, and doorbells have never been so ominous."

Film Inquiry's Kevin Lee states that, despite "clunky writing," the film's efficiency lies in two areas; the house—with its creepy noises and gross leakages—is more than just old and in need of renovation. It is also clear that Stevens is exploring the fallout of toxic masculinity through Don's disreputable past and his refusal to accept help with the extensive renovations. Lee notes that it is this behavior and shady past that make Don "a vulnerable victim to the house's psychological effect. Whether or not the film works for you depends on your opinion of Don." Lee goes on to point out that the film's final act clearly demonstrates Stevens' knowledge of surrealism and his fondness for the 2017 Darren Aronofsky psychological horror film, mother!

Brian Tallerico from RogerEbert.com stated that Stevens' previous experience as a producer of respected indie horror films is evident in his confidence behind the camera in his directorial debut. Tallerico points out the metaphor of the main character's devotion to the physical task of fixing something physical because he is unwilling to perform the real repair on his deeply-flawed character, and that is the source of the problem.

Slashfilm reviewer Matt Donato decided, "there have been smoother and more leveled 'tortured past inhabitants won't leave' realty nightmares than Girl On The Third Floor, but this one ain't too shabby." Donato notes how director Stevens "breaks a man down, tears a house apart, and leaves us with the ultimate conclusion that forgiveness can only be granted so many times."

References

External links 
 Official Page at Dark Sky Films
 

2019 films
2019 horror films
American haunted house films
American supernatural horror films
Films shot in Illinois
2010s English-language films
2010s American films